GroundUP (stylised groundUP) is an album by American jazz fusion group Snarky Puppy that was released in 2012. The album was recorded live at Shapeshifter Lab in Brooklyn, New York, in front of a studio audience.

Track listing

Personnel
Source: 
Michael League –  bass guitar, keybass
Andy Hunter – trombone
Jay Jennings – trumpet, flugelhorn
Mike Maher – trumpet, flugelhorn
Chris Bullock – tenor saxophone
Bill Laurance – keyboards
Cory Henry – keyboards
Shaun Martin – keyboards
Justin Stanton – keyboards, trumpet
Mark Lettieri – electric guitar
Bob Lanzetti – electric guitar, baritone guitar
Chris McQueen – electric guitar, baritone guitar
Nate Werth – percussion
Keita Ogawa – percussion
Marcelo Woloski – percussion
Robert "Sput" Searight – drums
Zach Brock – violin
Eylem Bisaldi – violin
Maria Im – violin
Roni Gan – viola
Jody Redhage – cello

References

2012 live albums
Snarky Puppy albums